Chu Siu Kei (born 11 January 1980, Hong Kong) is a former Hong Kong professional footballer who played as a midfielder. He is currently the assistant coach of Hong Kong Premier League club HK U23.

Club career
Chu was a member of the Sun Hei squad that won five trophies (League, Silver Shield, League Cup, FA Cup and Hong Kong Football Sevens) during the 2004-05 season. He scored a total of three goals for Sun Hei in the 2008-09 Hong Kong First Division League season as the club finished 5th in the league table. He did however assist the club to win the 2008-09 Hong Kong League Cup.

He played as midfielder for Shatin SA but in the early season he was plagued by injuries. On 24 October 2009, he started his first game for Shatin and promptly scored a hat-trick, one of them a bicycle kick, and helped his team beat Tai Po FC 4:1 to register Shatin's first win of the season. Chu was also named the match's Most Valuable Player. Chu in total scored 5 goals for Shatin but the club finished 9th and was relegated at the end of the season. At the end of the season, he was selected as a member of the Hong Kong League XI to play against Birmingham City FC in the Xtep Cup.

Chu moved to Kitchee after Sha Tin was relegated at the end of the 2009-10 season. In the penultimate match against Tai Chung FC, Chu Siu-Kei scored a hat-trick and helped secured a 7:1 win for Kitchee. Chu finished the season having scored 5 goals for Kitchee and the club duly won its first league title in 47 years, allowing the club to play in both the 2011 Barclays Asia Trophy and 2012 AFC Cup. Chu was named the Best Eleven of the 2010-11 Hong Kong First Division League season.

After South China's decision to voluntarily relegate following the 2016-17 Hong Kong Premier League season, Chu's contract was terminated. Although he tried to find work with other clubs, his efforts were unsuccessful. Ultimately, Chu announced his retirement on 8 August 2017.

International career

Chu is a regular member of the Hong Kong national football team. On 4 October 2010, in a friendly away to India, in the 76th minute, Chu played a clever back heel to captain Li Haiqiang who volleyed the ball home for a 1:0 victory for Hong Kong.

Chu also took part in the 2014 FIFA World Cup Asian qualification matches for Hong Kong against Saudi Arabia. Because of that Chu was only able to play a symbolic 10 minutes against Chelsea FC in the 2011 Barclays Asia Trophy.

Honours

Club
Yee Hope
Hong Kong Senior Shield: 2000–01

Sun Hei
Hong Kong First Division: 2003–04, 2004–05
Hong Kong Senior Shield: 2004–05
Hong Kong League Cup: 2004–05, 2008–09
Hong Kong FA Cup: 2002–03, 2004–05, 2005–06

Kitchee
Hong Kong First Division: 2010–11, 2011–12, 2013–14
Hong Kong League Cup: 2011–12
Hong Kong FA Cup: 2011–12, 2012–13

Sun Source
Hong Kong First Division: 2014–15

International
Hong Kong
Hong Kong-Macau Interport: 2007
Guangdong-Hong Kong Cup: 2013

Career statistics

International
As of 4 June 2013

References

External links
 Chu Siu Kei at HKFA
 

1980 births
Living people
Hong Kong footballers
Association football midfielders
Hong Kong Rangers FC players
South China AA players
Sun Hei SC players
Yee Hope players
Metro Gallery FC players
Hong Kong First Division League players
Hong Kong Premier League players
Hong Kong international footballers
Hong Kong League XI representative players
Footballers at the 1998 Asian Games
Asian Games competitors for Hong Kong